Michael Dewayne Sutton (born April 25, 1975) is a former American football defensive end. Sutton played college football at LSU. Professionally, Sutton began his career with the Tennessee Oilers of the NFL in 1998 and later played in NFL Europe, XFL and Arena Football League. He was a two-time All-NFL Europe honoree.

Early life and college career
Born in Jacksonville, North Carolina, Sutton graduated from Salmen High School in Slidell, Louisiana. Sutton then attended Louisiana State University, where he played at defensive end for LSU Tigers football from 1994 to 1997 with a total of 80 tackles, 14 tackles for loss, 10 sacks, and three fumble recoveries.

Pro football career
After the 1998 NFL Draft, Sutton signed as a free agent with the Tennessee Oilers on April 20, 1998. He spent much of the season on the practice squad before being promoted to the active roster on December 12 to replace an injured Anthony Cook. Sutton made his first and only NFL game appearance in the season finale on December 26, making one tackle.

In the spring of 1999, the Oilers became the Tennessee Titans and allocated Sutton to the Rhein Fire of NFL Europe. Sutton had 19 tackles, 2.5 sacks, an interception, a forced fumble, and a pass defended in 1999 with the Fire. On September 5, 1999, the Titans placed Sutton on injured reserve.

In 2000, Sutton signed with the Jacksonville Jaguars and played in 10 games for the Rhein Fire of NFL Europe during the spring. He had 39 tackles, nine sacks, a forced fumble, and three passes defended for the Fire and was on the 2000 All-NFL Europe team. Sutton was released from the Jaguars on August 24, 2000 prior to the regular season.

Sutton started two games for the Memphis Maniax of the newly created XFL in 2001, starting two games with three tackles. Later in 2001, Sutton played for the Los Angeles Avengers of the Arena Football League.

In 2002, Sutton returned to NFL Europe and started 10 games for the Amsterdam Admirals. With 29 tackles, six sacks, two forced fumbles, seven passes defended, and an interception returned for a touchdown, Sutton made his second All-NFL Europe team.

Sutton played in three games for the BC Lions of the Canadian Football League in 2003, making five tackles and two passes defended in three games.

From 2004 to 2008, Sutton played in the Arena Football League.

References

1975 births
Living people
People from Jacksonville, North Carolina
American football defensive ends
LSU Tigers football players
Tennessee Oilers players
Rhein Fire players
Tennessee Titans players
Berlin Thunder players
Memphis Maniax players
Los Angeles Avengers players
Amsterdam Admirals players
Berlin Thunder coaches
Indiana Firebirds players
Tampa Bay Storm players
Columbus Destroyers players
Georgia Force players
Dallas Desperados players